Route 25 Business or Highway 25 Business may refer to:

  Interstate 25 Business
  U.S. Route 25 Business
  Arkansas Highway 25B
  Maine State Route 25 Business
  Mississippi Highway 25 Business
  New York State Route 25A Business (former)

See also
List of highways numbered 25
List of highways numbered 25A
List of highways numbered 25AD
List of highways numbered 25B
List of highways numbered 25C
List of highways numbered 25T